SP Chemicals, a Singapore-based company, is one of the largest ion-membrane chlor-alkali producer and aniline producer in the PRC.  It was  listed on the Main Board of SGX-ST on 6 August 2003.

Products 
SP Chemicals engages in the manufacture and sale of the chemical industry's basic building blocks - caustic soda, chlorine, hydrogen and its related downstream products. Their products are materials widely used in various applications across a diverse range of industries.
Products include: aniline, caustic soda, chlorine, chlorobenzene, nitrochlorobenzene, nitrobenzene, vinyl chloride monomer (VCM). To further drive its growth, SP Chemicals plans to invest approximately RMB1.1 billion in facilities for the production of styrene monomer, an intermediate raw chemical used in making polystyrene plastics, protective coatings, polyesters and resins.

Vietnam Petrochemical Industrial Park 
SP Chemicals is planning to build an integrated petrochemical park of 1,300 hectares and a naphtha cracking plant in the Vietnam Petrochemical Industrial Park, with a production capacity of 800,000 tpa of ethylene annum, to supply raw materials to their own facilities in the PRC, and Hoa Tam Petrochemical Park, and, to a lesser extent, for export.

This mammoth project is targeted to be completed within 15 years in 2 development phases:
 Phase One – To build a naphtha cracking and utility plant; targeted to be completed in 2014 at an investment of US$1.5 billion.
 Phase Two – To promote the Hoa Tam Petrochem Park and invite investment for upstream and downstream petrochemical projects; targeted to be completed by 2024.

Energy & Chemicals Training Centre 
In 2019, SP launched a training and solution centre to support the energy and chemicals sector, in partnership with the technology and engineering firm Emerson. The purpose of the centre is to close critical-skills gap and boost companies' productivity, by training students and current employees from the energy, chemicals and pharmaceutical sectors over the next two years.

This information needs further verification. It appears the name of the company "SP Chemicals" has been mistaken for the acronym of Singapore Poly, an unrelated institute where the Emerson centre  is located.

References

External links
 SP Chemicals website
 China Fine Chemical Industry Taixing Park
 SP Chemicals moves into production of styrene monomer  (Channel News Asia)
 S'pore firms scale up operations in Vietnam to tap opportunities (Channel News Asia)

Chemical companies of Singapore